Liangtian is a town under the administration of Luchuan County, Guangxi, China. , it has one residential community and 13 villages under its administration.

References 

Towns of Guangxi
Luchuan County